Kettu Kalyanam, also known as , was the name of an elaborate marriage ceremony of the Samanthan, Nair, Maarar, and Ambalavasi communities of the southern Indian state of Kerala. The customs varied from region to region and caste to caste. The  is ceremonial only, for after the rituals the groom returns to his house, never to meet the bride again. In some parts of Malabar immediately after the ceremony, a formal divorce is constituted, whereas in other areas the groom enters into  with the girl and becomes her husband in practice, if the girl be of marriageable age.

Ceremonies

Among the communities that practiced the custom, a grand ceremony would be held at its oldest ancestral house. This ceremony, called  ("tāli-tying ceremony") had to be performed for each girl before puberty, on pain of her excommunication from her caste. At the ceremony, each bridegroom, in the company of representatives of every household in the neighbourhood, tied a gold ornament (a ) round the neck of his bride. Each couple was then secluded in a room of the ancestral house for three days and nights. On the fourth day the bridegrooms departed; they had no further obligations, and did not need to visit the brides again.

Groom selection

Kinship and purpose

After the  ritual, a girl was regarded as having attained the status of a mature woman, ready to bear children to perpetuate her lineage. This social recognition of marriageability was entirely separate from community acknowledgement of physical maturity upon reaching puberty. For that, there was a separate ceremony, performed at a girl's menarche. 

The -tying ritual was both a religious and legal ceremony between the lineage and  group, and thus can be seen as a form of mass marriage, even though it is in practice only a mock-marriage, while the later  are actual marriages.

References

Kerala society
Indian wedding traditions